The Marriott Center is a multi-purpose arena in the western United States, located on the campus of Brigham Young University in Provo, Utah. It is home to the BYU Cougars men's and women's basketball teams. The seating capacity for basketball games at the Marriott Center is officially 18,987.

The largest basketball arena in the West Coast Conference (in which BYU competes for most sports, except football), it is among the largest on-campus basketball arenas in the nation. In addition to basketball, the Marriott Center is used for weekly devotionals and forums.

History
The Marriott Center was named in honor of benefactor and hotel tycoon J. Willard Marriott, founder of the Marriott Corporation. When the arena opened  in 1971, it passed the University of Minnesota's Williams Arena as the largest college basketball arena in the nation. It was also the largest venue in the nation built for basketball, larger than any NBA (or ABA) arena at that time. It lost both distinctions when the University of Kentucky opened Rupp Arena in 1976, but remained as the largest basketball-specific facility on a U.S. college campus until 1987, when the University of Tennessee opened Thompson–Boling Arena.

Prior to 1971, the Cougars played basketball games at Smith Fieldhouse, which remains the primary venue for volleyball and gymnastics. The court was replaced in 2003 with a permanent floor.

The Marriott Center hosted the West Regionals of the NCAA Division I men's basketball tournament four times (1972, 1977, 1979, 1982), and the Western Athletic Conference men's basketball tournament in 1988.

On February 7, 1993, Cody Judy threatened LDS apostle Howard W. Hunter with a supposed bomb in front of a crowd of 15,000–17,000 onlookers in the Marriott Center.

A devotional conference featuring LDS Church President Gordon B. Hinckley on October 17, 1995, drew the largest crowd to ever attend an activity at the arena: 25,875 people. 

In 1999, the Marriott Center set an NCAA record for highest attendance for a men's volleyball match: 14,156 watched BYU defeat Long Beach State on February 19, shattering the previous record of 10,225 (held by Hawaii).

Renovations

In April 2012, BYU announced renovations to the Marriott Center. The lower bench seating on the north side was replaced with prime chair seating. A new sound system was installed, and the men's and women's locker rooms were renovated. The changes in the lower seating lowered the Marriott Center’s capacity from 22,700 to 20,951.

The remaining lower bench seating was replaced after the 2015 season, lowering seating capacity to around 19,000. The new renovation also installed new video boards for the Marriott Center and added the Marriott Center Annex building, where practice sessions take place for both BYU basketball teams. The Marriott Center Annex was placed between the Marriott Center and the BYU Broadcasting Building.

See also
 List of NCAA Division I basketball arenas

References

External links
Brigham Young University Athletics – Marriott Center

BYU Cougars basketball venues
College basketball venues in the United States
Sports venues in Utah
Brigham Young University buildings
Sports venues completed in 1971
1971 establishments in Utah